Fabrice Mbuyulu (born 13 June 1987), better known by his stage name Fabregas Le Métis Noir is a Congolese singer-songwriter dancer and record producer from his own label Wanted Record founded in 2015. He started his musical career by singing in a Catholic church. He is also known as a member of Wenge Musica Maison Mère from 2008 to 2011

Discography

Studio albums 

 2013: Amour Amour (Editionn Collector)
 2014: Anapipo
 2015: Pona Yo
 2015: Amour Amour (Le metis noir)
 2016: Eliminado
 2016: Je Pense <<Antidote>>
 2016: Je Pense <<Poison>>
 2019: Mise à jour - Volume.1
 2019: Mise à jour - Volume.2

Singles 

 2014: Mascara (Ya Mado)
 2015: Tengana

See also 

 Werrason
 Fally Ipupa
 Ferre Gola

References

External links 
 Result on Fabregas

Living people
1987 births
21st-century Democratic Republic of the Congo male singers
People from Kinshasa
21st-century Democratic Republic of the Congo people